Ischnura demorsa is a damselfly in the genus Ischnura ("forktails"), in the family Coenagrionidae ("narrow-winged damselflies"). The species is known generally as the "Mexican forktail".
The distribution range of Ischnura demorsa includes Central America and North America.

The IUCN conservation status of Ischnura demorsa is "LC", least concern, with no immediate threat to the species' survival. The population is stable.

References

Further reading
 Arnett, Ross H. (2000). American Insects: A Handbook of the Insects of America North of Mexico. CRC Press.
 Paulson, Dennis R., and Sidney W. Dunkle (1999). "A Checklist of North American Odonata including English name, etymology, type locality, and distribution". Slater Museum of Natural History, University of Puget Sound, Occasional Paper no. 56, 88.

External links
NCBI Taxonomy Browser, Ischnura demorsa

Ischnura
Insects described in 1861